Cynthia Aguilar Villar (born Cynthia Ampaya Aguilar on July 29, 1950) is a Filipina politician currently serving as a Senator of the Philippines. She was a member of the House of Representatives for the Lone District of Las Piñas from 2001 to 2010 before winning a seat in the Senate in 2013, placing tenth. Villar topped the Senate race with 25 million votes, the most votes in election history until it was surpassed by Robin Padilla in 2022, and was re-elected for a second term in the Senate and got first in the results of the 2019 elections.

Personal life
Villar was born on July 29, 1950 in Muntinlupa, then a municipality in Rizal, to Filemon Aguilar, a long-time mayor of Las Piñas and congressman, and Lydia Ampaya.

She spent her elementary years at the Muntinlupa Elementary School, where she graduated in 1962. In 1966, she graduated high school from the Philippine Christian University. She then obtained a degree in Bachelor of Science in Business Administration at the University of the Philippines Diliman (UP Diliman) in 1970. It is where in UP she met her husband, Senator Manny Villar. Two years later, in 1972, she obtained a master's degree in Business Administration at the New York University.

She practiced as a financial analyst at the Philippine Shares Corporation and a professor at the Far Eastern University before marrying Villar in 1975. After her marriage, she helped her husband in managing his business ventures and became the director and vice president of the Household Finance Corporation. She later managed the Capitol Development Bank, where she served as its treasurer from 1989 to 1990 and its president from 1990 to 1998.

In 1992, she founded the Villar Foundation, where she is currently its managing director.

When Manny Villar became Speaker of the House of Representatives in 1998, she became the chairwoman of the Congressional Spouses Foundation, serving until 2000.

She has a brother named Vergel Aguilar, who is the former mayor of Las Piñas.

Political career
In 2001, Villar ran as Representative of the Lone District of Las Piñas and won in a landslide victory. She served in that post until 2010.

When her husband became the Senate President in 2006, she became the president of the Senate Spouses Foundation, Inc., serving until December 2008.

Plunder charges were filed in 2008 against Villar, then a representative, and her husband, then-senator Manny Villar. The plunder complaint relates to an alleged fraudulent deal in 1998 with the Bangko Sentral ng Pilipinas. She and her husband were cleared of the charges by the Office of the Ombudsman in 2010.

In 2013, Villar ran as senator under the ticket of his husband's rival in the 2010 presidential elections, President Benigno Aquino III and won, finishing in 10th place.

On July 10, 2014, Villar criticized the arrest of senators Bong Revilla, Juan Ponce Enrile, and Jinggoy Estrada after the three were linked as the masterminds to the Priority Development Assistance Fund scam or Pork Barrel scandal.

On May 17, 2016, Villar's wealth increased by 76% according to government data.

In August 2016, Villar's son, Mark Villar, was appointed by newly elected president Rodrigo Duterte as the public works and highways secretary. In October 2016, Villar backed President Duterte's Philippine Drug War, which has killed at least 20,000 Filipinos. In November 2016, Villar voted against a resolution which sought to reject the Duterte-initiated burial of the late dictator Ferdinand Marcos in the Libingan ng mga Bayani.

In February 2017, Villar voted in favor of the Tax Reform for Acceleration and Inclusion Act, which increased the inflation rate and cost of goods in the country. Villar afterwards blamed "traders" for the negative effects of the law that she supported. On the same month, after President Rodrigo Duterte announced his intention to withdraw a treaty with the United States, Villar followed suit by not supporting the resolution requiring Senate concurrence on treaty withdrawals. On June 14, 2017, Villar urged the government to impose a ban in 'unli-rice'. On December 13, 2017, Villar was unable to vote for the martial law extension in Mindanao, but senator Vicente Sotto III noted that she “would have voted yes.”

On March 6, 2018, Villar stated that she has 'no conflict of interest' in Boracay, where her company operates. In June 2018, Villar rejected the possibility of same sex marriage in the Philippines. On May 16, 2018, a local executive revealed that Villar's property firm was behind the levelling and destruction of mountains in Boracay. On May 17, 2018, Villar did not support the resolution against the ouster of Chief Justice Maria Lourdes Sereno via a quo warranto petition. In October, she filed her certificate of candidacy for re-election in the 2019 senate elections. On July 23, 2018, Villar announced that she "admired" President Rodrigo Duterte. On November 26, 2018, Villar supported a "60–40 profit sharing with China."

In January 2019, President Rodrigo Duterte backed Villar's re-election candidacy. Villar then placed first in the Senate race with 25,283,727 votes, the most votes in the Philippine election history, and was re-elected for a second term in the Senate.

Controversies

On nurses
In a senatorial forum on GMA News TV on February 23, 2013, economist Winnie Monsod asked Villar to explain why, as chairman of the House Committee on High Education, she opposed the move to close nursing schools that the Commission on Higher Education (CHED) said did not meet minimum requirements to continue operations.

She explained that she favored the students who wanted to continue their schooling. CHED, she said, wanted to close the nursing schools because they didn't have the required tertiary hospitals where the nurses would eventually be trained before they graduate and get their BS Nursing degrees.

This part of Villar's response became controversial: "Actually, hindi naman kailangan ng nurse na matapos ang BSN (BS Nursing). Kasi itong mga nurses, gusto lang nilang maging room nurse, o sa Amerika o sa other countries, ay mag-aalaga lang sila. Hindi naman kailangan na ganoon sila kagaling. (Nurses don't actually need to finish BS Nursing. These nurses only want to become a room nurse or caregivers in America or in other countries. They don't need to be that good.),” Villar said in response.

Villar apologized on March 4, 2013, to Filipino nurses who were hurt by her recent statement on the nursing profession.

“Taos-puso po akong humihingi ng paumanhin sa lahat ng mga nurse at kani-kanilang pamilya na labis na nasaktan sa aking kasagutan sa tanong na ibinato sa akin sa isang programa sa TV (I sincerely apologize to all the nurses and their families who were hurt by my response to the question I was asked on TV),” she posted on her Twitter account

On physicians during the COVID-19 pandemic
On August 1, 2020, Villar again drew flak in the midst of the COVID-19 pandemic after a group of physicians appealed to the national government to revert the National Capital Region back to an enhanced community quarantine due to the disappointing increase in the number of COVID-19 cases. When asked for comment, Villar was noted to say, “Hindi na siguro. Pagbutihan nila trabaho nila. (Maybe not. They should just do their jobs better.)”. Many on social media were offended by her statement. Several hours later, her name trended on Twitter including calls to boycott the products that belong to her family business including the residential community, Camella and the shopping mall chain, Vista Malls.

She later said that she was referring to workers in government, including herself.

References

External links
 Senator Cynthia  A. Villar – Senate of the Philippines
 
 The Lifestyle of Rep. Cynthia Villar

1950 births
Living people
People from Muntinlupa
University of the Philippines Diliman alumni
People from Las Piñas
Nacionalista Party politicians
Senators of the 18th Congress of the Philippines
Senators of the 17th Congress of the Philippines
21st-century Filipino women politicians
21st-century Filipino politicians
Senators of the 16th Congress of the Philippines
Members of the House of Representatives of the Philippines from Las Piñas
Filipino billionaires
20th-century Filipino businesspeople
Women members of the House of Representatives of the Philippines
Women members of the Senate of the Philippines
Senators of the 19th Congress of the Philippines
21st-century Filipino businesspeople